The Dock of the Bay – The Definitive Collection is a compilation album by Otis Redding, released in 1987.

Track listing

Certifications

References

1987 compilation albums
Otis Redding albums
Compilation albums published posthumously
Rhythm and blues compilation albums